Kevin David McGrath  (born March 1963) is a British businessman, philanthropist. and Executive Producer of an Oscar and BAFTA Winning Film [3]

Early career

McGrath graduated from the Polytechnic of the South Bank (renamed London South Bank University in 1989) with a BSc (Distinction) in Estate Management. He obtained a post-graduation RICS Diploma in Property Investment (Award Winner) from The College of Estate Management Reading.  McGrath was elected a member of the Royal Intuition of Chartered Surveyors in 1990 and became a Chartered Surveyor. He has worked in the property industry for 35+ years and is a member of the Royal Institution of Chartered Surveyors., the Worshipful Company of Chartered Surveyors and is a Freeman of the City of London.

McGrath is Principal of The McGrath Family Office; Founder and Executive Chairman of M&M Asset Management and Non-Executive Chairman of Regional REIT Plc, and was previously managing director and Senior Adviser of F&C REIT Asset Management, which rebranded as BMO Real Estate Partners in July 2016.

Prior to F&C REIT, McGrath was a founding equity Partner in REIT Asset Management, a property investment finance and asset management partnership, which managed a global commercial property portfolio. Previous to REIT Asset Management, Kevin was a Senior Investment Surveyor with Hermes Investment Management, the Fund Manager for the British Telecommunication and Post Office Pension Schemes. Before that he worked for various local authorities in a variety of property related positions. And prior to that he worked in manufacturing and banking.

Politics

McGrath was a candidate for the European Parliament 2009 Election; a candidate for the North East Hampshire Parliamentary constituency at the 2005 General Election; a candidate for Ealing Council in the 2006 London Council Elections and for the London Assembly in the 2012 London Elections.

Other

Appointed as an Officer of the Most Excellent Order of the British Empire in the Queen's 2016 Birthday Honours List for Services to Charities

Kevin was The High Sheriff of the County of Greater London 2014/15

He is the Representative Deputy Lieutenant for the London Borough of Hammersmith and Fulham. 2015 - Current

Kevin was awarded an Honorary Degree of Doctor of the University from the University of Surrey in 2017 in recognition of an outstanding contribution to the arts.

Kevin was awarded an Honorary Degree of Doctor of Letters from the London South Bank University in 2022 in recognition of an outstanding contribution to business and charity.

He is Executive Producer of a short feature film An Irish Goodbye Winner of an Oscar for Best Live Action Short Film at the 95th Academy Awards  and Winner of the Best British Short Film at the 76th BAFTA Awards. 

McGrath is Founder and Chair of the McGrath Charitable Trust, 2000 - current

Kevin is Deputy Chairman and co-founder of The Clink Prison Restaurant Charity, the first and only public restaurant to be built inside working British prisons 2010 - current

McGrath was appointed a Trustee of the Moorfields Eye Charity in 2022.

Chair of The Lyric Theatre Hammersmith 2005 - 2015

Trustee of The Old Vic Theatre, 2012-2021  

He is Non-Executive Property Advisory Board Member of The Reserve Forces and Cadets Association for Greater London

McGrath was a former Director and Chairman of Queens Park Rangers Football Club plc; Plays Off 2003 and Promotion 2004

Kevin is Vice Chair of the QPR Sport in the Community Trust. and is Chair of QPR Womens Football Club.

He was Proprietor of Tribune Magazine;

Chair of Arts Education Schools, 2018 - 2021

McGrath served as a Commissioner on the Independent Commission on English Prisons Today under the leadership of Cherie Booth and sat on the Criminal Justice Policy Working Group under the Leadership of the Rt Hon Sadiq Kahn MP Shadow Justice Minister and the Independent Alcohol and Crime Commission Chaired by John Podmore and is a Commissioner on the independent Commission on Political Power convened by Baroness Frances D`Souza . He was a member of the Rt Hon Ed Balls Shadow Chancellors advisory team and the London Mayor Sadiq Khans pre-election Mayoralty Business Engagement Board.

McGrath is also an Ambassador for the Commonwealth Youth Enterprise Project; a London South Bank University Court Member; Honorary Vice President of the Commonwealth Youth Orchestra & Choir; and Patron of Clean Break Charity and of The Forgiveness Project.

Former Board Governor of the London South Bank University; and Trustee of The Chartered Surveyors Training Trust; The WAVE Trust; The Guildford School of Acting; The Howard League for Penal Reform; The National Education Trust; and The Prison Advice and Care Trust; and Council Member of The Victoria League for Commonwealth Friendship. He is a former member of Liberty Human Rights Policy Executive Board, UCLH Cancer Centre Development Board member and Ambassador for The Make Justice Work Charity. He was a school Governor for Canberra School; The Phoenix High School and The Eleanor Wilkinson School for Girls.

Personal

Born in West London and currently living in Ealing, Kevin is married to Kate and they have two children.

References

British businesspeople
Deputy Lieutenants of Greater London
High Sheriffs of Greater London
Living people
Labour Party (UK) parliamentary candidates
Officers of the Order of the British Empire
People from Ealing
1963 births